Robert Florin Boboc (born 27 May 1995) is a Romanian professional footballer who plays as a midfielder. Boboc was formed as a player at the best academies from Pitești: Argeș Pitești, Nicolae Dobrin Football Academy and Dănuț Coman Football Academy. At senior level he played for Mioveni, Universitatea Cluj, Argeș Pitești and Hermannstadt. He made his Liga I debut on 16 May 2015 for Universitatea Cluj in a 0-0 draw against FC Brașov.

Honours
Hermannstadt
Cupa României: Runner-up 2017–18

References

External links
 
 

1995 births
Living people
Sportspeople from Pitești
Romanian footballers
Association football midfielders
Romania youth international footballers
Liga I players
Liga II players
CS Mioveni players
FC Universitatea Cluj players
FC Argeș Pitești players
FC Astra Giurgiu players
FC Hermannstadt players
FC Dunărea Călărași players
CSM Reșița players
CSC 1599 Șelimbăr players